Ravanan is a 2006 Malayalam action thriller directed by debutante Jojo Varghese with Kalabhavan Mani in the lead. Jagathy Sreekumar, Megha Jasmine, Madhu Warrier, Sudheesh, Nishant Sagar, Sreejith, Kollam Thulasi, Madhu, and Rajan P. Dev play the other pivotal roles.

Plot
The story centres on the murder of a High Court Chief Justice and how S. P. Varghese Antony hunts down the killers. Popularly known as Ravanan, for his aggressive and belligerent style of behaviour, the brainy and brawny super cop begins the investigation. Jagathy Sreekumar plays the sub-inspector assisting him in the case. How Ravanan solves the murder mystery forms the rest of the story.

Cast

 Kalabhavan Mani as Varghese Antony IPS, Superintendent of Police
 Jagathy Sreekumar as SI Sundaram
 Nishant Sagar as Vinod kumar
 Sudheesh as Sunny Kuriyan
 Madhu Warrier as Rajeev Warrier
 Rajan P Dev as I.G Raman Menon
 Madhu as Chief Minister
 Megha Jasmine as Radhika menon
 Anil Murali as CI Sreekumar
 Girija Preman
 Kalady Jayan
Kollam Thulasi as P.K Sukumaran
 Sreejith Ravi as Madhavan Menon
Indulekha as Renuka
 Jayakrishnan as DySP Prakash Menon
 Ravi Vallathol as Judge Raghava Menon
 Augustine as Krishnakumar
 Ajay Ratnam as R.Krishna moorthy(R.K)
 Baburaj
Monilal as Sivankutty
 Sadiq as CI Eswar Warrier
 Nandhu

References

External links
 
 Ravanan at the Malayalam Movie Database

2000s Malayalam-language films
2006 directorial debut films
2006 films